The Central Midlands Coastal Football League is an Australian rules football league in Western Australia, with clubs situated in the northern wheatbelt and on the coast north of Perth.  It was founded in 1992 through the merger of the Coastal Football Association and Central Midlands Football League.

Current clubs

Former clubs

Grand final results

Ladders

2011 ladder

2012 ladder

2013 ladder

2014 ladder

2015 ladder

2016 ladder

2017 ladder

References

Further reading 
 A Way of Life - The Story of country football in Western Australia - Alan East

Australian rules football competitions in Western Australia